Tan Sri Abdul Rashid Hussain (born 1946 Singapore) is a Malaysian entrepreneur. He is the founder of RHB Group. In less than a decade, he built a financial services conglomerate comprising a stockbroking firm, a commercial bank, a finance company and a merchant bank-RHB Bank. He began his financial services career in 1971 with Strauss Turnbull in Britain and returned to Malaysia in 1975 to work in Bumiputra Merchant Bankers Bhd. He then left Bumiputra Merchant Bankers in 1983 to start Rashid Hussain Securities. Under his stewardship, RHB Securities became one of the leading stockbrokers in Malaysia.

Hussain was the Chairman of Putrajaya Holdings Sdn Bhd from 1995 to 2000 and served as a board member and Chairman of the executive committee of Khazanah Nasional Berhad from 1994 to 1998.

He was married to a daughter of Robert Kuok. Hussain is the youngest son of Mohammed Hussain, who hailed from Penang and who later moved to Singapore and developed a successful business there. His mother is of Malay and Arab descent.

References
The two men behind the banking group The Star.

Living people
Malaysian businesspeople
Malaysian people of Malay descent
Malaysian company founders
Malaysian chairpersons of corporations
1946 births